Top Gear GT Championship, known in Japan as , is a racing game developed and published by Kemco for the Game Boy Advance and released in 2001. The game was a launch title in Japan and Europe for the Game Boy Advance, and was the first Game Boy Advance game in the Top Gear series.

Reception

The game received mixed reviews according to the review aggregation website GameRankings. NextGen said of the game, "Great paint job, but the engine's not running on all cylinders." In Japan, Famitsu gave it a score of 21 out of 40.

Notes

References

External links
 

2001 video games
Kemco games
Top Gear (video game series)
Game Boy Advance games
Game Boy Advance-only games
Video games developed in Japan